José André Guidino Otero (born September 4, 1996 in Lima) is a Peruvian footballer who currently plays for Cusco FC.

Club career
Guidino started his career with amateur side Esther Grande, before participating in 'The Chance', organised by the Nike Academy, where he was one chosen in the final 2014–2015 squad. He scored the winning goal against a QPR XI for the Academy.

After leaving the Nike Academy, Guidino joined Torneo Descentralizado side Deportivo Municipal, signing a two-year contract.

Career statistics

Club

Notes

References

1996 births
Living people
Peruvian footballers
Peruvian expatriate footballers
Association football defenders
Deportivo Municipal footballers
Club Alianza Lima footballers
Cusco FC footballers
Peruvian Primera División players
Footballers from Lima
Nike Academy players
Peruvian expatriate sportspeople in England
Expatriate footballers in England